Virtual Sky (styled within the magazine as VIRTUAL SKY), is a virtual aviation online magazine, published monthly by the International Virtual Aviation Organisation, on issuu.com.

The readership comprises IVAO members, along with flight simulation and aviation enthusiasts worldwide.

Each month features a theme chosen by the magazine team and members are encouraged to share their related experiences and anecdotes.

Senior (departmental) and divisional staff members also write about their visions and on-going projects, while official online events are promoted, next to certified Virtual Airlines, in the VA Hangar section.

History
The magazine was founded by Vybhava Srinivasan when he was the public relations director of IVAO, acting as its editor-in-chief, along with Yigit Yildrim, who took charge of the Layout and Design.

The issues became less and less frequent, until July 16, 2012, when Vybhava decided to shut-down the project due to the "reduction in the readership" according to him.

This project was relaunched after 2 years by M.E. and Stephen Howarth, IVAO's public relations director and assistant director, respectively, to publish the 14th issue on January 6, 2014.

The PR-Team recognised then the importance for the magazine, acting as the principal members outreach tool for the organisation.
 
Fernando Hippólyto and Fares Belkhiria were afterwards selected, starting from August 19, 2015, to carry on the Virtual Sky project, committing to provide regular monthly issues.

Following the departure of Fernando Hippólyto as magazine team manager, the publication moved to a quarterly publication in 2016.

Editions  
 January 2008
 April 2008
 October 2008
 December 2008
 April 2009
 September 2009
 January 2010
 October 2010
 April 2011
 July 2011
 November 2011
 February 2012
 May 2012
 January 2014
 October 2015
 December 2015
 Jan / Feb / Mar 2016

References

External links
 IVAO Official website
 Official ISSUU Account

Online magazines published in the United States
Monthly magazines published in the United States
Quarterly magazines published in the United States
Aviation magazines
Defunct magazines published in the United States
Magazines established in 2008
Magazines disestablished in 2012
Online magazines with defunct print editions